The Chicago Catholic League (CCL) is a high school athletic conference based in Chicago, Illinois, United States. All of the schools are part of the Illinois High School Association, the governing body for Illinois scholastic sports. While some of the schools are coeducational institutions, the conference only supports athletics for male teams. (The Girls Catholic Athletic Conference serves as its female counterpart.)

The CCL is perhaps best known for its success in football, water polo, wrestling, and baseball. Since the Illinois High School Association began a state football tournament in 1974, the CCL has placed first or second more than any conference or league in the state.  Since 2002 when the IHSA first sponsored a state tournament in water polo, the CCL has not failed to win the state title for boys. Since 1984, when the IHSA moved to a dual-team state series in wrestling (previously, the team champion was based on the advancement of individuals in the individual state tournament), the CCL has also finished first or second more than any conference or league.

The conference's alumni include stars of the past like Heisman Trophy-winning quarterback Johnny Lattner, Cy Young Award-winning pitcher Denny McLain and Basketball Hall of Fame member Moose Krause and more contemporary athletes such as former NBA player Corey Maggette and All-Pro quarterback Donovan McNabb, Antoine Walker. Perhaps the conference's most accomplished alumnus is Duke University men's basketball coach Mike Krzyzewski.

Member schools

St. Joseph High School joined the conference in 2011, however the school has since closed in 2021. Lake Forest Academy joined the conference for football only in 2011. St.Viator High School joined in 2010 to compete in the conference for lacrosse.  Additionally, St. Patrick High School, Notre Dame High School, and Marist High School participate in the conference for Boys Bowling.

For those schools which are coed, most of the girls teams compete in the Girls Catholic Athletic Conference.  The girls teams from Bishop McNamara, Fenwick, and Providence compete in the East Suburban Catholic Conference.

Holy Trinity (Tigers) (1443 W. Division St) was also a Catholic League team.  Last Catholic League season for football was 1965.

History 
The Chicago Catholic League was formed in 1912 as a way to give the all-male Catholic schools of the area interscholastic competition. The move to form the league was precipitated when the dominant high school league in the metropolitan area, the Cook County High School League, delayed the application of St. Ignatius Academy and DePaul Academy.  Representatives of eight schools met at the Great Northern Hotel—De Paul Academy, St  Ignatius Academy, St Rita College, St. Cyril College (which would become Mount Carmel High School), Cathedral High, St. Philip High, Loyola Academy, and De La Salle Institute — but could not get together on the particulars to form a football–only league.

In the third week of November, the schools managed to form a league and drew up a schedule of games in basketball and indoor baseball.  The founding members of the league were St. Stanislaus, De la Salle, De Paul, St. Ignatius, St. Cyril, St. Philip, Loyola, and Cathedral. By the spring when a baseball schedule was drawn up, Holy Trinity had joined the league, but Cathedral dropped out, leaving an eight-team circuit. In the fall of 1913, the league introduced football. By the following year, league champion De Paul, felt feisty enough to invite St. John's Preparatory from Danvers, Massachusetts, to Chicago to engage in an intersectional contest. De Paul narrowly lost the game, but it demonstrated to the league that its program was thriving. Two years later De Paul traveled to Boston and met Beverly High in Fenway Park, destroying the team 30–7. More schools joined the circuit before the decade was up, St. Patrick in 1913, and St. Mel in 1918.

Because the Catholic school population relative to the mainstream public secondary schools and the private school was more an immigrant and working class population, the sports that the league initially sponsored reflected this demographic makeup. For example, during the first four years of the league's existence, only baseball, basketball, indoor baseball, and football were offered. Basketball was the most robust sport, as the league not only provided for heavyweight and lightweight schedules, but also bantamweight (added in 1919) and flyweight competition (added in the early 1920s). The Chicago Public High School League and Suburban League offered basketball only in the heavyweight and lightweight classes, after experimenting only a few years with a bantamweight class.

The Catholic League added track and field in 1917, but it was not until 1924 that three "country club" sports were added to the league's schedule  golf, tennis, and swimming. The addition of these sports brought the league up to the level of offerings by the Chicago and Suburban public leagues. The 1920s also saw the addition of more schools to the league—St. George, Joliet De la Salle, and Fenwick.

Some working class sports that had great appeal in some Catholic schools were boxing and bowling, and the league sponsored competition for a few years during the Depression in boxing, and much longer in bowling.

By the late 1950s some of the Catholic League members were growing restive, wanting to participate in the state tournaments sponsored by the Illinois High School Association (IHSA). The four Christian Brothers schools – De La Salle, St. George, St. Mel and St. Patrick – withdrew from the Catholic League and joined the IHSA upon its formation of the Chicagoland Prep League (CPL) on 27 February 1961. St. Ignatius would defect to the CPL two years later on 9 April 1963.

The Catholic League finally joined the IHSA in 1974, and eventually saw the return of St. Ignatius, St. Patrick, and De La Salle into the league.  Because of their membership in the IHSA, the 29-year-old tradition of a Catholic League All-Star basketball game ended in 1974. In the beginning of 1996 the CCL and the East Suburban Catholic Conference and other Catholic high schools decided to make a super catholic conference. They called it the Chicago Metropolitan Conference. Every school from the East Suburban was in the conference except Nazareth Academy and Marian Central Catholic. This conference ended in the 2002–2003 season and both conferences went back to normal. Swimming and water polo founded the Metro Catholic Aquatic Conference in 1999 which included the all East Suburban Catholic and CCL teams and still hosts a conference championship for both sports. The MCAC won every state title in water polo from 1974 to 2011.

Past members 
 (Defunct) Archbishop Weber High School Red Horde
 (Defunct) St. Martin de Porres Academy Silver Eagles
 (Defunct) St. George Dragons
 (Defunct) Mendel Catholic Monarchs
 (Defunct) St. Elizabeth Ironmen
 (Defunct) DePaul Academy Blue Demons
 (Defunct) St. Mel Knights
 (Defunct) St. Philip Gaels
 (Defunct) St. Joseph Chargers
 Guerin College Preparatory High School Gators
 Joliet Catholic Hilltoppers
 St. Patrick Shamrocks
 Carmel High School
 Marist
 Marian Catholic
 Niles Notre Dame
 Benet Academy
 St. Viator
 Gordon Tech (now known as DePaul College Prep)
 Bishop McNamara Catholic High School (Kankakee, IL)

State championships

Baseball
State champions
 1975–76 • Brother Rice (Class AA)
 1977–78 • Providence Catholic (Class A)
 1981–82 • Providence Catholic  (Class A)
 2012–13 • Mount Carmel (Class 4A)
 2013–14 • Providence Catholic (Class 4A)
 2014–15 • Providence Catholic (Class 4A)
 2015–16 • Providence Catholic (Class 4A)
 2018–19 • Montini Catholic (Class 3A)

Basketball
Prior to the 2007–2008 season, the state basketball title was contested in two classes.  Since then, it is contested in four classes.

State champions
 1978–79 • Providence Catholic (Class A)
 1984–85 • Providence St. Mel (Class A)
 1984–85 • Mount Carmel (Class AA)
 2002–03 • Hales Franciscan (Class A)
 2003–04 • Leo (Class A)
 2008–09 • Seton Academy (Class AA)
 2010–11 • Hales Franciscan (Class 2A)

The 2004–05 Class A title was stripped from Hales Franciscan after it was determined that the school had not been approved by the Illinois State Board of Education between 2003 and 2005.

Football
From 1974–79, IHSA had 5 classes based on enrollment for football (1A-5A). In 1980, IHSA expanded to 6 classes.  2001 saw the latest change, which added 2 more classes, which is what is played to date.

In 2019–20, CCL merged with the ESCC for football only. The CCL/ESCC is divided into six divisions.

State champions
 1976–77 • St. Laurence (Class 5A)
 1978–79 • St. Rita (Class 5A)
 1980–81 • Gordon Tech (Class 6A)
 1980–81 • Mt. Carmel (Class 5A)
 1981–82 • Brother Rice (Class 6A)
 1982–83 • Bishop McNamara (Class 3A)
 1985–86 • Bishop McNamara (Class 3A)
 1986–87 • Bishop McNamara (Class 3A)
 1987–88 • Providence Catholic (Class 4A)
 1987–88 • Bishop McNamara (Class 3A)
 1988–89 • Mt. Carmel (Class 6A)
 1989–90 • Mt. Carmel (Class 5A)
 1990–91 • Mt. Carmel (Class 5A)
 1991–92 • Mt. Carmel (Class 5A)
 1991–92 • Providence Catholic (Class 4A)
 1993–94 • Loyola Academy (Class 6A)
 1994–95 • Providence Catholic (Class 5A)
 1995–96 • Providence Catholic (Class 4A)
 1996–97 • Mt. Carmel (Class 5A)
 1996–97 • Providence Catholic (Class 4A)
 1997–98 • Providence Catholic (Class 4A)
 1998–99 • Mt. Carmel (Class 5A)
 1999–2000 • Mt. Carmel (Class 5A)
 2000–01 • Mt. Carmel (Class 5A)
 2001–02 • Providence Catholic (Class 6A)
 2002–03 • Mt. Carmel (Class 6A)
 2002–03 • Providence Catholic (Class 5A)
 2004–05 • Providence Catholic (Class 6A)
 2006–07 • St. Rita (Class 7A)
 2012–13 • Mt. Carmel (Class 8A)
 2013–14 • Mt. Carmel (Class 7A)
 2014–15 • Providence Catholic (Class 7A)
 2015–16 • Montini Catholic (Class 6A)
 2015–16 • Loyola Academy (Class 8A)
 2018–19 • Loyola Academy (Class 8A)
 2019–20 • Mt. Carmel (Class 7A)
 2021–22 • Fenwick (Class 5A)
 2022–23 • Mt. Carmel (Class 7A)
 2022–23 • Loyola Academy (Class 8A)

Golf 
State champions
 1986–87 • Loyola Academy (Class AA)
 1992–93 • Bishop McNamara (Class A)
 1996–97 • Loyola Academy (Class AA)
 2000–01 • Loyola Academy (Class AA)
 2000–01 • Bishop McNamara (Class A)
 2001–02 • Loyola Academy (Class AA)

Swimming and Diving
State champions
 1989–90 • Fenwick
 1990–91 • Fenwick
 1991–92 • Fenwick

Track and Field
State Champions
 1980–81 • Leo (Class A)
 1994–95 • Leo (Class AA)
 1997–98 • Leo (Class A Co-Champions)
 2001–02 • Leo (Class A)
 2002–03 • Leo (Class A)
 2011–12 • Leo (Class A)
 2017-18 • Marmion (Class AA)

Water Polo
The IHSA began a state series in water polo with the 2001–02 school year.  Prior to that, a high school state championship was sponsored by Illinois Water Polo. There was no Championship Game in 1979 as Water Polo switched from a Fall to a Spring sport. 
State Champions
ISA State Champions 
 1974 • Fenwick
 1975 • Mount Carmel
 1976 • Fenwick
 1977 • Fenwick
 1978 • Loyola
 1980 • Brother Rice
 1981 • Brother Rice
 1982 • Brother Rice
 1983 • Brother Rice
 1984 • Brother Rice
 1985 • Brother Rice
 1986 • Brother Rice
 1987 • St. Laurence
 1988 • Brother Rice
 1989 • Brother Rice
 1990 • Fenwick
 1991 • Fenwick
 1992 • Fenwick
 1993 • Fenwick
 1994 • Brother Rice
 1995 • Brother Rice
 1996 • Brother Rice
 1997 • St. Patrick
 1998 • Brother Rice
 1999 • Fenwick
 2000 • Fenwick
 2001 • Fenwick

IHSA State Champions
 2002 • Fenwick
 2003 • Brother Rice
 2004 • Fenwick
 2005 • Fenwick
 2006 • Fenwick
 2007 • Fenwick
 2008 • Fenwick
 2009 • Fenwick
 2010 • Fenwick
 2011 • Fenwick
 2013 • Fenwick
 2014 • Loyola

Wrestling
State Champions
 1977–78 • Providence Catholic (Class A)
 1980–81 • Providence Catholic (Class A)
 1987–88 • Providence Catholic (Class AA)
 1988–89 • Providence Catholic (Class AA)
 1989–90 • St. Laurence (Class AA)
 1991–92 • Mount Carmel (Class AA)
 1992–93 • Mount Carmel (Class AA)
 1993–94 • Mount Carmel (Class AA)
 1996–97 • Providence Catholic (Class AA)
 1997–98 • Providence Catholic (Class AA)
 1998–99 • Providence Catholic (Class AA)
 1999–2000 • Providence Catholic (Class AA)
 2000–01 • Providence Catholic (Class AA)
 2001–02 • Providence Catholic (Class AA)
 2002–03 • St. Rita (Class AA)
 2003–04 • St. Rita (Class AA)
 2017–18 • Montini Catholic (Class 3A)
 2018–19 • Montini Catholic (Class 3A)

Prep bowl

See also: 
List of Prep Bowl championship games

The Prep Bowl is an annual contest played between the Chicago Catholic League and the Chicago Public League and is played at Chicago's Soldier Field. It was first played in 1927, though after a forfeit in 1928, was not played again until 1933, and was the premier high school football event in Illinois until the IHSA formed the state championship football playoffs in 1974.  The 1927 game between Mt. Carmel and Carl Schurz High School drew an estimated 50,000 fans; the largest crowd to see a prep football contest in American history, up to that time.  In subsequent years, larger crowds were drawn to the annual game.

With the advent of the IHSA state series, the Prep Bowl was contested by the winner of a special playoff in each league played by teams not qualifying for the state playoffs, and teams that were eliminated in early rounds of the state playoffs.  It is traditionally played on the Friday after Thanksgiving, which is the same day which the IHSA plays its smaller school state championships in football. As of the 2009 game, the Catholic League holds a 51–23–2 advantage in the series.

In 1981, the IHSA membership voted on a limitation that prohibited member schools from participating in more than nine games, plus the IHSA state series.  The Prep Bowl was given a special exemption from this.

Notable alumni 
Bishop McNamara
 Thomas Guynes – lineman for Michigan and Arizona Cardinals
 Tyjuan Hagler – NFL linebacker, played for the Indianapolis Colts (Super Bowl XLI champions)
 Mike Kimberlin – Running Back
 Ron Young – Retired Fire Chief of Kankakee, Football Captain (78), Wrestling Coach (91-04)

Brother Rice
 Jim Adduci – MLB outfielder, starred collegiately at Southern Illinois
 Bob Cummings – drafted #5 overall in the 1978 MLB Draft by the San Francisco Giants
 David Diehl – offensive tackle for the New York Giants
 Mark Donahue – former guard with the Cincinnati Bengals
 Bobby Frasor – McDonald's HS All-American point guard, starred collegiately at North Carolina, where he won the 2009 national title
 Phil Hicks – NBA forward, drafted #27 in 1976, starred collegiately at Tulane
 Rico Hill – NBA forward, drafted #31 in 1999, starred collegiately at Illinois State
 Paul Hutchins –  tackle for the Green Bay Packers
 Pete Mackanin – MLB infielder (1973–81), manager of Pittsburgh Pirates and Cincinnati Reds
 John Meyer – AFL linebacker and NFL assistant coach, starred collegiately at Notre Dame
 Ed Olczyk – NHL center and Stanley Cup champion, head coach and broadcaster with the Chicago Blackhawks and Pittsburgh Penguins
 Lance Ten Broeck – PGA golfer currently on the Senior Tour, won 1984 Illinois Open Championship, starred collegiately as an All-American at Texas

DeLaSalle
 Brian Bogusevic – Houston Astros outfielder
 Jocko Conlan – Hall of Fame baseball umpire
 George Connor – Chicago Bears, 1948–1955
 Moose Krause – Basketball Hall of Famer
 LaRue Martin – Loyola basketball star, No. 1 NBA draft pick
 Lou Pote – pitcher for Anaheim Angels
 Renaldo Wynn – defensive end for the Washington Redskins and Jacksonville Jaguars

DePaul Academy
 Bill Muellner – played football for the Chicago Cardinals as well as for the Los Angeles Bulldogs, Cincinnati Bengals, and New York Yanks
 Bill Steinkemper – played football for the Cincinnati Bengals and Chicago Bears
 Dick Evans – played football for the Green Bay Packers and Chicago Bears
 Steve Juzwik – played football for the Washington Redskins, then had three seasons in the All-American Football League with the Buffalo Bisons (1946–47) and Chicago Rockets (1948)
 Joey Meyer – head coach of DePaul men's basketball

Fenwick
 Johnny Lattner – Heisman trophy winner for Notre Dame
 Corey Maggette – NBA player
 Mike Rabold – NFL player
 Ken Sitzberger – gold medalist diver, 1964 Summer Olympics
 Marques Sullivan – NFL player
 John Teerlinck – NFL player

Gordon Tech
 Chris Bourjos – MLB player for the San Francisco Giants in 1980
 Gregg Bingham  – (Class of 1969) – former Houston Oilers linebacker
 Larry Langowski – wrestler who represented Mexico in the 120 kilogram weight class at the 2008 Summer Olympics
 Robert Meschbach – professional soccer player who set the (then) national high school record with 71 goals in one season; remains an Illinois state record (as of 2008).
 Ron Plantz – (Class of 1982) offensive lineman (center) for Notre Dame 1982–1986 and Indianapolis Colts 1987–90
 Frank Santana – (Class of 1974) 1977 NCAA wrestling national champion (190 lbs.) and three-time wrestling All-American at Iowa State; first Cuban-American to win a collegiate wrestling national championship
 Jitim Young – basketball player who played at Northwestern University and professionally in Europe and the Dominican Republic

Hales Franciscan
 Rich Gardner – defensive back for the Tennessee Titans
 Jerome Randle – player in Turkish Basketball League
 JaVale McGee – NBA player

Holy Cross
 Garrett Wolfe – Northern Illinois and Chicago Bears player

Leo
 Chris Watson – NFL player for the Denver Broncos
 Harold Blackmon – Northwestern and NFL player
 Jason Jefferson – NFL player for the Buffalo Bills
 Andre Brown – former forward for NBA's Memphis Grizzlies

Loyola Academy
 Bert Metzger – member of College Football Hall of Fame
 Matt Cherry – played football for the Cincinnati Bengals
 Conor Dwyer – 2012 gold medalist USA 4x200-meter freestyle relay swim team
 Dave Finzer – NFL punter for the Chicago Bears and Seattle Seahawks
 Christian Friedrich – first-round pick of the Colorado Rockies in the 2008 Major League Baseball Draft
 Charlie Leibrandt – played baseball for the Cincinnati Reds (1979–1982), Kansas City Royals (1984–1989), Atlanta Braves (1990–1992), Texas Rangers (1993)
 Tim Foley – played football for the Miami Dolphins
 Paul McNulty – played end for the Chicago Cardinals
 Nick Rassas – last two-way player at the University of Notre Dame, NFL player
 John Scanlan – played guard and halfback for the Chicago Cardinals and Louisville Colonels
 Bob Skoglund – played football for the Green Bay Packers
 Freddie Lindstrom – member of the Baseball Hall of Fame
 Al Montoya – first-round (6th overall) selection of NHL's New York Rangers in 2004

Mount Carmel
 Elmer Angsman – played halfback for the Chicago Cardinals
 Denny McLain – Cy Young Award winner for 1968 World Series champion Detroit Tigers
 Frank Cornish – offensive lineman for Super Bowl champion Dallas Cowboys of 1992 and 1993
 Mel McCants – former Purdue and Los Angeles Lakers forward
 Chris Calloway – former New York Giants wide receiver
 Hal Cherne – played offensive line for the Boston Redskins
 Bob Davis – played guard for the Los Angeles Rams
 Simeon Rice – played defensive end for the Tampa Bay Buccaneers and Arizona Cardinals
 Joe Williams – six-time U.S. national champion and 2004 Olympian
 Donovan McNabb – five-time all pro quarterback for the Philadelphia Eagles, currently with the Washington Redskins
 Antoine Walker – three-time NBA All Star
 Matt Cushing – Pittsburgh Steelers tight end, 1999–2005
 Chris Chelios – NHL player for Detroit Red Wings and Chicago Blackhawks
 Steve Lawson – played offensive line for the Cincinnati Bengals, Minnesota Vikings, and San Francisco 49ers
 Matt Kerrigan – played quarterback for the New England Patriots
 Dan Goich – played defensive tackle for the Detroit Lions, New York Giants, and New Orleans Saints
 Darrell Hill –  Kansas City Chiefs wide receiver
 Bob Gonya – played offensive tackle for the Philadelphia Eagles
 Tony Furjanic – Notre Dame and NFL linebacker
 Steve Edwards –  Chicago Bears and New York Giants offensive tackle

St. George
 Tony Barone – head basketball coach at Creighton University, Texas A&M, and the Memphis Grizzlies

St. Ignatius
 Tom O'Hara – Olympian and former world record holder for indoor mile and NCAA champion in Division I cross country
 Mark Dalesandro – MLB catcher and infielder (1994–1995, 1998–1999, 2001).

St. Laurence
 Jim Dwyer – 17 seasons of Major League Baseball, member of Baltimore Orioles 1983 World Series champions
 Tim Grunhard – Notre Dame and Kansas City Chiefs center, Pro Bowl center
 Stan Smagala – played football for the Dallas Cowboys
 Kevin Bracken – Olympic Greco-Roman wrestler
 Jeff Kacmarek – played nose tackle for the Detroit Lions
 Jim Davey – Detective for the Chicago Ridge Police department and 2019 Officer of the Year

St. Mel
 Walt Barnes – played football for the Washington Redskins and Denver Broncos
 Tom Bettis – played football for the Green Bay Packers, Pittsburgh Steelers, and Chicago Bears
 Tom Keating – played football for the Buffalo Bills, Oakland Raiders, Pittsburgh Steelers, and Kansas City Chiefs
 Bernie Leahy – played football for the Chicago Bears
 Frank Quilici – Major League Baseball player, second baseman in 1965 World Series for Minnesota Twins; manager of Twins 1972–75

St. Rita
 Chuck Brodnicki – running back for the Brooklyn Dodgers
 Matt Conrath – played for the St. Louis Rams
 Dennis Lick – offensive lineman for the Chicago Bears
 Tony Simmons – NFL wide receiver
 Ahmad Merritt – NFL wide receiver (Arizona Cardinals) and Chicago Rush (Arena League) player
 Ed Farmer – MLB All-Star in 1980 and play-by-play voice of Chicago White Sox from 1991-2019
 Tom Flaherty – played for the Cincinnati Bengals
 Darius Fleming – Super bowl champion with the New England Patriots; played at University of Notre Dame
 Nick Etten – MLB All-Star first baseman
 Bruce Gaston – former player for the New England Patriots, Green Bay Packers, and Chicago Bears
 Jim Clancy – former Toronto Blue Jays pitcher, All-Star in 1982
 Ron Weissenhofer – linebacker for the New Orleans Saints
 Bob Zimny – tackle for the Chicago Cardinals
 Mike Kafka – Current quarterbacks coach for the Kansas City Chiefs; played at Northwestern University and was quarterback for the Philadelphia Eagles
 Ryan Donahue – kicker for the Detroit Lions
 Kenny Golladay- Pro Bowl wide receiver for the New York Giants; attended Northern Illinois University and North Dakota University
 Pat O'Connor - Super Bowl champion with the Tampa Bay Buccaneers
 Charles Matthews - NBA G-League player, played for the Michigan Wolverines   
 Kevin Carberry - current  offensive line coach for the Los Angeles Rams
 Mark Payton - MLB player, previously with the Cincinnati Reds
 Tony Zych - MLB pitcher, previously with the Seattle Mariners 
Providence Catholic
 Pete Bercich – NFL linebacker (1995–98, 2000) for Minnesota Vikings
 Brad Guzan – goalkeeper for Chivas USA and Aston Villa of English Premier League; starting goalkeeper for 2008 U.S. Olympic team
 Carmen Pignatiello – pitched for Chicago Cubs (2008)
 Bryan Rekar – Major League Baseball pitcher (1995–2002)
 Eric Steinbach – NFL offensive lineman
 Miles Boykin - NFL wide receiver for Baltimore Ravens and Pittsburgh Steelers
Weber
 Mike Krzyzewski ("Coach K") – Duke University and Team USA basketball coach
 William Joseph "Moose" Skowron Jr. – first baseman for New York Yankees, five-time AL All-Star (1957, 1958, 1959–61)

Membership timeline 
Beginning in 1912, the Chicago Catholic League competes in 11 boys, 13 girls and 13 coed sports and activities within the IHSA.

References

External links 
 Chicago Catholic League
 Illinois High School Association

High school sports conferences and leagues in the United States
Sports competitions in Chicago
Illinois high school sports conferences
Catholic sports organizations